The Louisiana Baptist Convention (LBC) is an association of Baptist churches in the U.S. state of Louisiana. Affiliated with the Southern Baptist Convention, the Convention is composed of approximately 1,595 member congregations representing 620,000 members.

History
The Convention was founded in 1848 at Rehoboth Baptist Church in Mount Lebanon in Bienville Parish in north Louisiana through the work of James Scarborough. It had an initial membership of 88 churches and 3,650 members.

Its early presidents included Edwin O. Ware, Sr., the principal founder of Louisiana College, the Baptist-affiliated undergraduate institution of higher learning in Pineville. Claybrook Cottingham, the president of Louisiana College from 1910–1941, was the LBC president from 1914–1916. More recent convention presidents include J. D. Grey of the First Baptist Church of New Orleans and Fred L. Lowery, the retired pastor of the First Baptist Church of Bossier City, a televangelist, and Christian author.

Edgar Godbold was from 1919 to 1923 the corresponding secretary of the LBC executive board. From 1942 to 1951, he was the president of Louisiana College and from 1950 to 1951 the LBC state president. An earlier Louisiana College president, W. C. Friley, was a corresponding secretary for the LBC in the 1880s.

Today
The convention headquarters is on MacArthur Drive in Alexandria, the seat of Rapides Parish and the largest city in Central Louisiana. The convention meets each November for its annual meeting. David Hankins, the Executive Director for 14 years will retire on June 30, 2019.  The Reverend Steve Horn, previously pastor of the First Baptist Church of Lafayette, has been selected to be the next Executive Director beginning July 1, 2019. The convention equips churches, encourages pastors, and assists in evangelistic efforts throughout the state.

References

Louisiana Baptist Convention History Page

External links
Louisiana Baptist Convention Official Website

Baptist denominations established in the 19th century
Conventions associated with the Southern Baptist Convention
Religious organizations established in 1849
Baptist Christianity in Louisiana
1849 establishments in Louisiana
Rapides Parish, Louisiana